BeaNet (abbreviation of Betaalautomaten Netwerk, Dutch for payment terminal network) was a Dutch system and organization for electronic payments, which was founded in 1988.

Adoption 
In March 1990, Esso included the possibility to pay with BeaNet. In January 1992, Albert Heijn was the first large supermarket in the Netherlands that adopted the usage of BeaNet.

Criticism 
Yvonne van Rooy, the staatssecretaris of economic affairs in the Third Lubbers cabinet, wanted to get rid of the monopolistic position of BeaNet in 1992.

Merger 
In 1993, a merger was announced between BeaNet, Bankgirocentrale and Eurocard Nederland. In 1994, they formed Interpay.

See also 
 Chipknip

References

External links 
 

Payment systems organizations
Financial services in the Netherlands
Banking organizations